Carla Moreno (born September 19, 1976 in São Carlos) is an athlete from Brazil, who competes in triathlon. She won the silver medal at the 1999 Pan American Games in Winnipeg, Manitoba, Canada.

Moreno competed at the first Olympic triathlon at the 2000 Summer Olympics.  She was one of two Brazilian athletes, along with Mariana Ohata, not to finish the competition.

At the 2004 Summer Olympics, Moreno again competed in the triathlon.  Again, she did not finish, making her the only athlete to start in both of the first two Olympic triathlons but finish neither.

References
 Profile

1976 births
Living people
Brazilian female triathletes
Olympic triathletes of Brazil
Triathletes at the 1999 Pan American Games
Triathletes at the 2000 Summer Olympics
Triathletes at the 2003 Pan American Games
Triathletes at the 2004 Summer Olympics
Triathletes at the 2007 Pan American Games
People from São Carlos
Sportspeople from São Paulo (state)
Pan American Games silver medalists for Brazil
Pan American Games medalists in triathlon
Medalists at the 1999 Pan American Games
20th-century Brazilian women
21st-century Brazilian women